is a railway station in the city of Matsumoto, Nagano, Japan, operated by the private railway operating company Alpico Kōtsū.

Lines
Nagisa Station is a station on the Kamikōchi Line and is 1.1 kilometers from the terminus of the line at Matsumoto Station.

Station layout
The station has one ground-level side platform serving a single bi-directional track.

Adjacent stations

History
It was renamed to its present name on 1 May 1927.

Passenger statistics
In fiscal 2016, the station was used by an average of 77 passengers daily (boarding passengers only).

Surrounding area
Nagisa Post office

See also
 List of railway stations in Japan

References

External links

 

Railway stations in Japan opened in 1922
Railway stations in Matsumoto City
Kamikōchi Line